Vincent Nguyen (born 24 February 1995) is a Vietnamese-Dutch professional basketball player for the  Hochiminh City Wings of the VBA.

Career
Nguyen was born in the Netherlands to a Vietnamese father and a Dutch mother. He began his youth career in 2007. He played for Den Bosch for two years.

Hanoi Buffaloes (2017-present)
Nguyen was selected by the Hanoi Buffaloes with the second overall pick in the 2017 VBA draft.

Career statistics

VBA

|-
| style="text-align:left;"| 2017
| style="text-align:left;"| Hanoi Buffaloes
| 17 || 17 || 36 || .380 || .260 || .880 || 5.4 || 5.6 || 2.2 || .2 || 13.7
|- class"sortbottom"
| style="text-align:left;"| 2018
| style="text-align:left;"| Hanoi Buffaloes
| 20 || 20 || 29 || .390 || .280 || .740 || 5.1 || 3 || 1.4 || .1 || 10.4
|- class"sortbottom"
| style="text-align:left;"| 2019
| style="text-align:left;"| Hochiminh City Wings
| 15 || 14 || 34 || .410 || .250 || .700 || 7.1 || 4.1 || 3.1 || .0 || 15.1
|- class"sortbottom"
| style="text-align:left;"| 2020
| style="text-align:left;"| Hochiminh City Wings
| 12 || 12 || 34 || .440 || .350 || .810 || 6.0 || 4.1 || 2.5 || .0 || 15.4
|- class"sortbottom"
| style="text-align:center;" colspan="2"| Career
| 64 || 63 || 33 || .410 || .290 || .780 || 5.9 || 4.2 || 2.3 || .1 || 13.7

Awards and honors

VBA
VBA assists leader: 2017
VBA Heritage MVP: 2019

References

External links
 Career statistics and player information from vba.vn

1995 births
Living people
Dutch men's basketball players
Dutch people of Vietnamese descent
Vietnamese basketball players
Vietnamese people of Dutch descent
People from Schijndel
Sportspeople of Vietnamese descent
Heroes Den Bosch players
Point guards
Sportspeople from North Brabant